Leimu is a Finnish surname. Notable people with the surname include:

Juha Leimu (born 1983), Finnish ice hockey player
Pekka Leimu (born 1947), Finnish ice hockey player

Finnish-language surnames